The Gottlieb Brown Covered Bridge, also known as the Sam Wagner Covered Bridge, is a historic wooden covered bridge located at Liberty Township near Potts Grove in Montour County, Pennsylvania and East Chillisquaque Township near Mooresburg in Northumberland County, Pennsylvania. It is an 86-foot, 8 inch long, Burr Truss bridge built in 1881.  It crosses Chillisquaque Creek.

The Gottlieb Brown Covered Bridge was listed on the National Register of Historic Places in 1979.

See also 
 National Register of Historic Places listings in Montour County, Pennsylvania
 National Register of Historic Places listings in Northumberland County, Pennsylvania

References 

Bridges in Montour County, Pennsylvania
Covered bridges on the National Register of Historic Places in Pennsylvania
Covered bridges in Montour County, Pennsylvania
Bridges completed in 1881
Wooden bridges in Pennsylvania
Bridges in Northumberland County, Pennsylvania
Tourist attractions in Montour County, Pennsylvania
Tourist attractions in Northumberland County, Pennsylvania
National Register of Historic Places in Northumberland County, Pennsylvania
National Register of Historic Places in Montour County, Pennsylvania
Road bridges on the National Register of Historic Places in Pennsylvania
1881 establishments in Pennsylvania
Burr Truss bridges in the United States